The 1987 Northwestern Wildcats team represented Northwestern University during the 1987 NCAA Division I-A football season. In their second year under head coach Francis Peay, the Wildcats compiled a 2–8–1 record (2–6 against Big Ten Conference opponents) and finished in ninth place in the Big Ten Conference.

The team's offensive leaders were quarterback Mike Greenfield with 1,265 passing yards, Byron Sanders with 778 rushing yards, and George Jones with 668 receiving yards.

Schedule

Personnel

References

Northwestern
Northwestern Wildcats football seasons
Northwestern Wildcats football